= Medusosphaera =

Scientific classification
- Kingdom: Fungi
- Division: Ascomycota
- Class: Leotiomycetes
- Order: Helotiales
- Family: Erysiphaceae
- Genus: Medusosphaera; Golovin & Gamalizk.

Genus of fungi

Medusosphaera is a genus of fungi in the family Erysiphaceae.
